A horsefeather is a whiskey cocktail. It was invented in Lawrence, Kansas, in the 1990s. It remains a regional drink in the Kansas City region. The drink is an iteration of the classic horse's neck cocktail and is similar to a Moscow mule.

A horsefeather is traditionally rye whiskey or blended whiskey, ginger beer, three dashes of Angostura bitters, and a little lemon juice. A highball glass is filled 3/4 with ice. The ingredients are then poured into the glass and stirred. There are many variations such as substituting ginger beer with ginger ale, adding cherries, muddling the lemon, replacing the lemon with lime, or creating a frozen version.

See also
 List of cocktails
 List of regional beverages of the United States

References

Cocktails with bitters
Cocktails with ginger beer
Cocktails with rye whisky
Cocktails with lemon juice